Jim Courier was the defending champion, but lost in the third round to Jonathan Stark.

Pete Sampras won the title by defeating Brad Gilbert 6–2, 6–2, 6–2 in the final. By doing so, Sampras clinches the World No. 1 spot for the first time in his career.

Seeds
The first eight seeds received a bye to the second round.

Draw

Finals

Top half

Section 1

Section 2

Bottom half

Section 3

Section 4

References

External links
 Official results archive (ATP)
 Official results archive (ITF)

1993 Japan Open Tennis Championships